Michela Zanetti (born 25 April 1991) is an Italian football forward, who most recently played for Pordenone in Serie B.

References

1991 births
Living people
Italian women's footballers
Women's association football forwards
A.S.D. Calcio Chiasiellis players